Sinni is a town in Oman.

Sini is one of the main villages  in the Wadi Ben Gaffer   area of  northern Oman.  High mountainous  and deep valleys  are seen here. Sini is well-connected to the nearest town Rustaq and Ibr by asphalt roads. It has mobile connectivity too. The people are mostly from Al Shikeily tribe.

Populated places in Oman